General Guadalupe Victoria International Airport, also known as Durango International Airport, is located northeast of Durango, Durango, Mexico. It is named after Guadalupe Victoria, the first President of Mexico.

In 2008 the terminal building of Durango Airport was expanded and completely remodeled. Among the renovations of the terminal building, the construction of a national and international waiting room overlooking the Apron, the extension of the main terminal building, the establishment of two baggage claim carrousels; National and international. In 2009 the apron was expanded and runway 03/21 was fully resurfaced as were the taxiways, this with the purpose of increasing its operating capacity.

In 2020, the airport handled 271,231 passengers, and in 2021 it handled 446,030 passengers.

Airlines and destinations

Passenger

Statistics

Passengers

Incidents and accidents
 On 31 July 2018, Aeroméxico Connect Flight 2431, an Embraer 190 XA-GAL en route to Mexico City, crashed after take-off. The plane was carrying 99 passengers and 4 crew members. There were no fatalities

See also

 List of the busiest airports in Mexico

References

External links

Airports in Durango
Buildings and structures in Durango
Transportation in Durango
Durango City